

Version information

Technical information

Supported CPU architectures

Supported operating systems

References

Java platform software
Java virtual machine
Software comparisons